Joker Is Alive is the eighth extended play by the South Korean girl group Dal Shabet. It was released on April 15, 2015, by Happy Face Entertainment.

Background
The EP was co-written and co-produced by member Subin.

Release history
In April 2015, Dal Shabet posted a picture for their comeback on their Facebook page. On April 10, they posted a picture with the title track "Joker". On April 12, they posted the first teaser for the album. On April 14, they released a teaser for the music video. The official video for the title track "Joker" was released on April 15, the same day as the album.

Commercial performance
The EP debuted at number 8 on South Korea's Gaon Album Chart. The title track, "Joker", charted at number 20 on the Gaon Digital Chart, becoming their 8th and last single to reach the Top 20.

Track listing

Charts

Sales

2015 EPs
Dal Shabet albums
Korean-language EPs
Kakao M EPs